Anatoliy Mykolayovych Kroshchenko is a Soviet football player and coach out of Ukraine.

Kroshchenko is a product of the Dynamo Kyiv football academy that he finished in 1957 along with Andriy Biba and Oleh Bazylevych. In 1957, he was listed on the roster for FC Dynamo Kyiv but never played a single game for the season. Next season Kroshchenko played for another team out of Kiev, SC Kiev Military District. Later he played for such teams like Lokomotyv Vinnytsia, Shakhtar Stalino, and Avanhard Kharkiv.

In 1963, Kroshchenko joined the newly established FC Karpaty Lviv where he spent most of his sports career. For Karpaty he set several club record such as becoming the player who scored the first goal in domestic competitions and the first goal in international games. For single season in 1966 Kroshchenko spend in FC Dnipro Dnipropetrovsk.

After retiring from a playing career Kroshchenko coached several Soviet teams in Ukraine among which were Shakhtar Kadiyivka, Desna Chernihiv, Metalurh Dniprodzerzhynsk, Okean Kerch, and Polissya Zhytomyr. After fall of the Soviet Union initially Kroshchenko coached FC Dynamo-3 Kyiv and FC Dynamo-2 Kyiv and later the Ukraine national under-19 football team taking it to the FIFA U-20 World Cup. Simultaneously, in 2001 he also was appointed the head coach of Ukraine national under-21 football team. In 2003-11, Kroshchenko was a head coach of the Dynamo Kyiv football academy.

Note: Until 2002, Under-19 football team was known as Under-18. In 2001 Ukraine U-18 qualified for the 2001 FIFA U-20 World Cup.

See also
 2001 FIFA World Youth Championship squads

External links
 Profile at ukrsoccerhistory.com
 
 

1937 births
Living people
Footballers from Kyiv
Soviet footballers
FC CSKA Kyiv players
FC Nyva Vinnytsia players
FC Shakhtar Donetsk players
FC Metalist Kharkiv players
FC Karpaty Lviv players
FC Dnipro players
Soviet football managers
Ukrainian football managers
FC Shakhtar Stakhanov managers
FC Desna Chernihiv managers
FC Stal Kamianske managers
FC Okean Kerch managers
FC Polissya Zhytomyr managers
FC Dynamo-3 Kyiv managers
FC Dynamo-2 Kyiv managers
Ukraine national under-21 football team managers
Dynamo Kyiv Football Academy managers
Association football forwards